Jefferson Township is one of seventeen townships in Adair County, Iowa, USA.  At the 2020 census, its population was 130.

History
Jefferson Township was organized in 1855.

Geography
According to the USGS, it contains two cemeteries: Jefferson and Loucks Grove.

References

External links
 US-Counties.com
 City-Data.com

Townships in Adair County, Iowa
Townships in Iowa
1855 establishments in Iowa
Populated places established in 1855